The Shaheed Veer Narayan Singh International Cricket Stadium Raipur, also known as Naya Raipur International Cricket Stadium, is a cricket arena in the city of Naya Raipur, Chhattisgarh, India.
The Cricket Stadium is India's 50th international cricket venue. First International cricket match played here was an ODI between India and New Zealand in 2023, which was won by India. This state-of-the-art cricket stadium hosts domestic and international cricket matches.
It is the largest sports stadium in Central India.

It is the third largest cricket stadium in India and fourth-largest cricket stadium in the world. The stadium has a seating capacity of 65,000 approx. Inaugurated in 2008, this ground hosted its first ever match in 2010, when the Canada national cricket team arrived in India and played a practice match against the Chhattisgarh state team. In 2013, the stadium was declared as a second home venue for the Delhi Daredevils in the Indian Premier League (IPL) and has since hosted many of the team's matches.

The stadium is named after Veer Narayan Singh Binjhwar, a landlord from Sonakhan who spearheaded the 1857 war Indian independence in Chhattisgarh.

Location

Stadium is situated in sector-3 of Naya Raipur, close to the Swami Vivekananda Airport in Naya Raipur and is 21 km away from Raipur main city.

Construction and arrangements

The construction of the stadium began in the year 2006 and it was completed in 2008 at the cost of Rs 145 Crore. It was built and owned by the Government of Chhattisgarh. The stadium has been built with a modern sports arena. The media facilities as well as the corporate boxes have been renovated and roofs cover the rest of the ground to provide comfort during heat periods.

Gallery

Pitch

The 22-yards strip usually offers a good balance between the bat and the ball. Three IPL , one CLT20 and 2020–21 Road Safety World Series games have been played at this venue and twice a team has crossed 200 here in two of Road safety world series matches. Apart from that, from time to time, the pitch offers some assistance to the pacers as well as the spinners. In all, it is a good sporting wicket, with something there for everyone to exploit.

BCCI had adjudged the pitch and ground of Shaheed Veer Narayan International Cricket Stadium as Best pitch and Best ground of Central Zone of the year 2017-18. It is notable that Naya Raipur Cricket Ground had been adjudged best during IPL 2013, Pitch curator Shamim Mirza and ground staff had been congratulated for the above achievement.

Initial game hostings

The First International Standard cricket match was played between Canada national cricket team and the Chhattisgarh cricket team, the game was a One Day match, played on 21 November 2010.

Stadium hosted a Half-Marathon, with the theme "Let us run" on 16 December 2012 to mark Vijay Diwas. Sunil Gavaskar had rated this stadium to as one of the best stadiums in the country and had proposed to utilize it for all types of matches. Irfan Pathan who was in awe of the facilities in the stadium noted that "When opportunities are created, and such facilities are in place, there is the hope that cricketers will emerge."

Hosting of Road Safety World Series

2020-21 Road Safety World Series was postponed on 24 March 2020 after four matches due to COVID-19 lockdown in India. After almost a year, the tournament resumed with the announcement of all the matches to be played in Raipur with all COVID-19 guidelines being followed allowing only 50% audience capacity of the stadium. The tournament hosted matches between 5 March to 21 March 2021.

2022 Road Safety World Series whose Five matches with two league matches and two semifinals and Final match was held in Raipur

Hosting of IPL, and CL T-20 matches

IPL matches

In January 2013, Board of Control for Cricket in India announced that Delhi Daredevils' Indian Premier League team shall be hosting two of their home matches in IPL - 6 at this stadium.

Raipur was allotted two IPL games in January after the chief minister invited GMR, the owners of the Daredevils franchise, to host some of their home matches there. Following inspections and a few meetings, the approvals came in, and in February the state's public works department swung into action to spruce up the ground in time; they completed work on the interior in less than two months.

On 28 April 2013, the first IPL match between Delhi Daredevils and Pune Warriors was played, in which Daredevils beat Warriors by 15 runs. With this it became the 19th venue to host any IPL match. The second match was played on 1 May 2013, between Delhi Daredevils and Kolkata Knight Riders. To ensure a greater success, Chhattisgarh State government had waived the entertainment tax on the tickets.

Few matches of the 2014 Indian Premier League had to take place at the stadium but could not take place due to rescheduling of the matches due to general elections.

In 2015 Indian Premier League, again Raipur was allotted two IPL games with Delhi Daredevils being the host team. On 9 May 2015, 1st match was played between Delhi Daredevils and Sunrisers Hyderabad, in which Sunrisers beat Daredevils by 6 runs and Moises Henriques was the Man of the Match for his 74 runs of 46 balls. The second match was played on 12 May 2015, between Delhi Daredevils and Chennai Super Kings, in which Daredevils comfortably beat Super Kings by 6 wickets with Zaheer Khan emerging as the Man of the Match due to his economical bowling.

Raipur was again announced as a 2nd Home Ground for Delhi Daredevils for 2016 Indian Premier League. On 20 May 2016, 1st match was played between Delhi Daredevils and Sunrisers Hyderabad. This was the 2nd Match in which both teams played each other in this stadium again. While in 2015, Sunrisers beat Daredevils in a close game, this time again it came down to the last ball and this time it was Daredevils who won by beating Sunrisers by 6 wickets on the very last ball of the Match due to Karun Nair's 83 runs knock for which he was chosen Man of the Match. On 22 May 2016, second match was played between Delhi Daredevils and Royal Challengers Bangalore, which was also the last league game of 2016 IPL and was a must win game for both teams to qualify for playoffs. Royal Challengers emerged as the winners by defeating Daredevils by 6 wickets and qualified for the playoffs. Delhi Daredevils were knocked out and failed to qualify.

CL T20

Stadium has also hosted eight T20 matches of the 2014 Champions League Twenty20. These consisted of two Group Stage games, plus all six Qualifier matches. The Qualifier matches were double-headers. For the first time in the history of CLT20 the qualifiers were sold out.

Praise for the stadium

 Sunil Gavaskar had rated this stadium to as one of the best stadiums in the country and had proposed to utilize it for all types of matches.
 Irfan Pathan who was in awe of the facilities in the stadium noted that "When opportunities are created, and such facilities are in place, there is the hope that cricketers will emerge. I hope to play again at this wonderful venue"
 Viv Richards We cannot even imagine that Chhattisgarh has such a big Cricket Stadium. This is one of the world's best Cricket Stadium.
 Yuvraj Singh It's a huge and magnificent Stadium, It's great opportunity for Chhattisgarh to shape future players from state by utilising the wonderful Infrastructure this Stadium has.
 Many Cricket personalities like Kapil Dev, Ravi Shastri and Anil Kumble have praised the beauty, Infrastructure and Location of the Stadium during their visit to Raipur.

References

External links
 Picture of stadium
 Cricinfo Website - Ground Page
 cricketarchive Website - Ground Page
 [More About Chhattisgarh progress]

Naya Raipur
Sports venues in Raipur, Chhattisgarh
Cricket grounds in Chhattisgarh
2008 establishments in Chhattisgarh
Sports venues completed in 2008
Cricket in Chhattisgarh